The 2013 Icelandic Men's Football League Cup was the 18th season of the Icelandic Men's League Cup, a pre-season professional football competition in Iceland. The competition started on 15 February 2013 and concluded on 27 April 2013. KR were the reigning champions, having won their fifth League Cup last year.

The 24 teams from the Úrvalsdeild karla and 1. deild karla were divided into 3 groups of 8 teams. Every team played every other team of its group once, home, away or on a neutral ground for a total of 7 games. Each group winner, each runner-up and the two best third-place finishes entered the quarter-finals.

Group stage
The games were played from 15 February to 20 April 2013.

Group 1

Group 2

Group 3

Knockout stage
The final round saw the 8 progressed teams meet in a knockout stage to determine the winner of the 2013 League Cup.

Quarterfinals
The games were played on 18 and 19 April 2013.

Semifinals
The games were played on 22 April 2013.

Final

Top goalscorers

References

External links
 Icelandic FA

Deildabikar
Deildabikar
Icelandic Men's Football League Cup